Ramón Luis Cruz Burgos (born September 27, 1985) is a Puerto Rican politician affiliated with the Popular Democratic Party (PPD). 
Cruz Burgos studied in Manuel Ortiz Elementary School and attended Luis Muñoz-Marín High School in Yabucoa, Puerto Rico. He studied applied physics at the University of Puerto Rico at Humacao. He represented Puerto Rico in several national competitions at NASA, including three times in the Great Moonbuggy Race.

As a student, he worked at Farmacias Feliciano in Yabucoa as a technician and was in charge of the delivery system of medicines to patient homes. Then he became a businessman, opening a local gym in Yabucoa. 
At 27, he has been a public servant for several years. He was a legislative aide at the minority leader's office in the Senate, and the minority leader of the legislative assembly in his hometown of Yabucoa.

He was elected to the Puerto Rico House of Representatives on November 6, 2012, to represent District 34, that includes the municipalities of Maunabo, Patillas and Yabucoa, Puerto Rico and parts of San Lorenzo.  
Since January 2, 2013, he has been focusing on his job as chairman of the House of Representatives’ Transportation, Infrastructure, Sports and Recreations Committee, and of the Joint Committee of the Legislative Assembly for Students Internships. Cruz-Burgos, as one of the youngest members of the legislative assembly, served for a brief period as chairman of the Youth Affairs Committee of the House of Representatives of the Commonwealth of Puerto Rico.

References

External links
  

|-

Living people
1985 births
Popular Democratic Party members of the House of Representatives of Puerto Rico
People from Humacao, Puerto Rico